Max Jury (born May 12, 1992) is an American singer-songwriter from Des Moines, Iowa, now living in London, United Kingdom. He has released two studio albums, Max Jury (2016) and Modern World (2019).

Career
On June 3, 2016, Max Jury released his eponymous debut studio album which includes his breakthrough single "Numb". He has toured with Lana Del Rey and Rufus Wainwright.

His second studio album, Modern World, was released on May 31, 2019, by Marathon Artists. It was produced by Robin Hannibal, a four-time Grammy-nominated producer and songwriter, best known for his co-writing credit on Kendrick Lamar's "Bitch, Don't Kill My Vibe".

Accolades

Discography

Studio albums
 Max Jury (2016)
 Modern World (2019)

EPs
 Something in the Air (2014)
 All I Want (The Sonic Factory Sessions) (2014)
 Under The Covers (2017)
 Notes From California – Demos EP (2018)
 The Shade and the Grass (2021)

Singles
 "Home" (2015)
 "Great American Novel" (2015)
 "Numb" (2016)
 "Beg & Crawl" (2016)
 "Standing On My Own" (2016)
 "Little Jean Jacket" (2016)
 "Sweet Lie" (2019)
 "Gone" (2019)
 "Modern World" (2019)
 "The Desperate Kingdom of Love" (with Fenne Lily) (2021)
 "Highway Song" (2021)
 "Is This Love?" (feat. Delilah Montagu) (2022)

References

External links
 

Living people
Musicians from Des Moines, Iowa
American male singers
Singers from Iowa
American expatriates in France
1992 births